Kévin Barré (born January 25, 1990 in Cholet, Maine-et-Loire) is a French footballer who plays as a defender.

Football career
Barré began in the Nantes youth clubs when he was 13 years old, then signed a three-year professional contract after he graduated. Due to injuries, he only played for one season. In 2011, he was picked up by Vannes for development with their reserve team. For two years, he played for and captained Fontenay. At this time, he was working on a personal project that would wind up being the opening of a Baby Time franchise in Nantes. His agency Baby Time connects parents to caregivers that suit their needs. He wanted to study early childhood prior to his football career and returned to this interest when sports were no longer viable in the long term. In 2014, signed to play with USSA Vertou.

Personal life
Barré has a certificate in interior design.

References

1990 births
Living people
People from Cholet
Association football defenders
French footballers
FC Nantes players
Vannes OC players
Ligue 2 players
USSA Vertou players
Sportspeople from Maine-et-Loire
Footballers from Pays de la Loire